Johnny Bravo is an American animated television series created by Van Partible for Cartoon Network. The series initially debuted as a trio of animated shorts on Cartoon Network's World Premiere Toons (later renamed What a Cartoon!), an animated shorts showcase that also featured potential series pilots from Genndy Tartakovsky (Dexter's Laboratory), Craig McCracken (The Powerpuff Girls), and Seth MacFarlane (The Life of Larry and Larry & Steve and Family Guy). What a Cartoon! premiered the first Johnny Bravo short on March 26, 1995. After a full series was greenlit by Cartoon Network, the shorts were later incorporated as the first episode of the show's first season, which premiered on the channel on July 7, 1997. Following a change in the main character's theme from being a womanizing Elvis impersonator to a brawny halfwit, the series entered its second season, which premiered on July 2, 1999. Partible left the series after the first season, but he returned for its fourth, which premiered on February 20, 2004, and ended on August 27, 2004.

Series overview

Episodes

Season 1 (1995-1997) 
The first three segments aired as part of World Premiere Toons, later renamed What a Cartoon!. They all later incorporated into the show's first season as the first episode.

Season 2 (1999–2000)

Season 3 (2000–02)

Season 4 (2004)

Specials (2001–2004)

India special (2009)

References

External links 
 
 

Lists of American children's animated television series episodes
Lists of Cartoon Network television series episodes
Johnny Bravo